The Titans Radio Network is an American radio network composed of 42 radio stations which carry English-language coverage of the Tennessee Titans, a professional football team in the National Football League (NFL).

Nashville market station WGFX serves as the network's flagship station. The network also includes 41 affiliates in the U.S. states of Tennessee, Kentucky and Alabama, along with nearby areas of Mississippi, eastern Arkansas, and far southern Illinois: twenty-two AM stations, sixteen of which supplement their signals with a low-power FM translator; and nineteen full-power FM stations, one of which supplements its signal with a low-power FM translator.

In addition to traditional over-the-air AM and FM broadcasts, network programming airs on satellite radio via Sirius XM and is available online via Sirius XM, TuneIn and NFL+.

History

As the Houston Oilers Radio Network (1960-1996)
The radio network began with the 1960 American Football League season as the Houston Oilers Radio Network, when the now-Tennessee Titans were based in Houston, Texas, and were known as the Oilers. Houston's KXYZ was the first flagship of the network for 1960 through 1963. KILT was the network's second flagship station from 1963 to 1975. In the beginning, Majestic Advertising of Milwaukee, Wisconsin was the holder of production rights to the radio broadcasts and pre-season TV broadcasts. In the 1970s and beyond, the network was operated by the Texas State Networks, which also produces their own radio news programs, along with agricultural news updates to their affiliated stations statewide.

KODA took over as the flagship station from 1985 through 1990. KTRH, which was the network flagship from 1976 to 1984, returned to be the flagship for the network for the franchise's final five seasons in Houston from 1991 until the end of the 1996 season. Around 35 to 40 (and at one point 86) stations broadcast all pre-season and regular season games each season, along with any playoff appearance the Oilers had during its time in Houston, including their AFC Championship Game appearances in 1978 and 1979. At one point during this time period after the mid 1980s, KQQK served as the flagship for the team's Spanish-language broadcasts in Houston.

During the team's final season in Houston, which was a disastrous turnout for the team in 1996, and in preparation for the team's move to their then-new headquarters in Nashville one year earlier than expected, the Oiler Radio Network was reduced from many affiliates across most of Texas and western Louisiana to only the flagship station in Houston, and a few affiliates in Tennessee, including its future flagship, then-Adult contemporary-formatted WGFX of Nashville (officially licensed to Gallatin). In October 1996, KTRH cut off games in favor of preseason basketball involving the Houston Rockets of the NBA.

As the Tennessee Oilers Radio Network and Titans Radio (1997-present)
It was renamed the Tennessee Oilers Radio Network in 1997 during the team's first season in Tennessee. The headquarters were now located in Nashville, but their home games were played in the Liberty Bowl in Memphis in 1997 and the Vanderbilt University's Stadium in 1998 and at least until their new stadium, the Adelphia Coliseum (now Nissan Stadium) was completed in August 1999. WGFX became the flagship station for the network, and served as flagship from 1997 until the completion of the 2001 season, although WGFX served as an "affiliate" for the 2004 season. Between the team's initial relocation and the start of the 1999 preseason, the radio network was spread to many radio stations across Tennessee, as well as southern and western Kentucky, northern and central Alabama, and portions of three other states. Titans Radio signed up over 50 affiliates in non-metro areas and a few major cities.

In Spring 1999, the radio network's name was changed to the Titans Radio Network to reflect the team's name change. The Titans Radio name was first used in the Titans first pre-season game in August 1999. Country-music formatted station WKDF, now one of WGFX's in-market sister stations, became the new flagship station in 2002. WGFX, which became a sports talk radio station in 2003, returned as the flagship for the Titans Radio Network starting with the 2010 season.

The team had long refused distribution of these radio broadcasts to Sirius XM, because the Titans' contract with Citadel Broadcasting (then-parent of both WKDF and WGFX) predated the arrival of satellite radio. However, in 2011, the Titans extend their agreement with existing radio partners while a provision allowing home games to be broadcast on Sirius XM. The Titans became the last NFL franchise to reach such a deal.

On-air radio personalities
Here is a list of the current personnel of the Titans Radio Network: 
Mike Keith — play by-play announcer, "The Voice of the Titans", well known for his trademark touchdown call, "Touchdown Titans!" 
Dave McGinnis — Color Analyst  
Johnathan Hutton — Sideline reporter
Rhett Bryan – Gameday host 
Kevin Dyson – Pre-game/Post-game analyst
Blaine Bishop - Pre-game/Post-game analyst
Mark Howard – Pre-game/Post-game Host

Programming outside live game coverage
The Mike Vrabel Show—Tuesdays at 6:00 PM CT  
Titans Tonight With Keith Bullock—Thursdays at 6:00 PM CT 
Titans Countdown – pre-game show, one hour prior to kickoff

Station list 

 Blue background indicates low-power FM translator.
 Gray background indicates station is a simulcast of another station.

See also 
WGFX
Tennessee Titans 
History of the Houston Oilers
History of the Tennessee Titans 
List of Tennessee Titans broadcasters
Titans All Access

References

External links
Titans Radio Official Site
Tennessee Titans --- Official Website

 

 

1997 establishments in Tennessee
National Football League on the radio
Sports radio networks in the United States
Tennessee Titans